Sri Pahang Football Club is a Malaysian professional football club based in Kuantan, Pahang. Founded in 1959 and has traditionally worn a yellow home kit since. At the beginning, club's home matches were held around the city public fields and outside Kuantan, predominantly around districts of Pahang.

The lowest point of the club was in 2012, when KBS Sri Pahang were relegated to the Malaysia Premier League. The club came back from the abyss to the Malaysia Super League in 2013 after winning the play-off match against Kedah Darul Aman.

Club licensing regulations

2018 season
 This club had obtained the FAM Club License to play in the 2018 Malaysia Super League season.
 This club had obtained the AFC Club License and is eligible to played either 2018 AFC Champions League or 2018 AFC Cup if qualified on merit.

2019 season
 This club had obtained the FAM Club License to play in the 2019 Malaysia Super League season.

History
Sri Pahang was established by Sultan Abu Bakar in 1959 to represent the state of Pahang in the HMS Beagle Cup. In the next year, the association begins with the preparation against another states before taking part for the first time in the HMS Beagle Cup. Construction of their current home ground, Darul Makmur Stadium, was completed by the Council of Kuantan in 1970.

Led by the legendary Jamal Nasir, Pahang FA won the first cup in 1983 when they won the Piala Malaysia, the most prestigious tournament in Malaysia football after a win over Selangor FA in the tournament, breaking the long duopoly of Selangor FA and Singapore FA and also became the first East Coast team to win it. Nonetheless, the most successful era was in the 1990s, when the association reached the final of Piala Malaysia 4 times even though they only succeeded once in 1992. 1992 was the best year when the association won the double, the Piala Malaysia and the league. Sri Pahang in that year was touted as the Dream Team when several high-profile players played for the association with the like of Dollah Salleh, Zainal Abidin Hassan, Ahmad Yusof, Khairul Azman Mohamed, Abdul Mubin Mokhtar, Australian football legend, Alan Edward Davidson and Singaporean football legend, Fandi Ahmad. The association defeated Kedah FA in final stage to win the Piala Malaysia, thanks to the fastest goal ever in Piala Malaysia history by Zulhamizan Zakaria.

Sri Pahang was also the first winner of the M-League in its new format in 2004.

As one of the most successful football teams in Malaysia from 1980 to 2007, Sri Pahang had produced many talented local players from the academy such as Khairul Azman Mohamed, one of the best goalkeepers in Asia in the 1990s, the prolific striker, Azizul Kamaluddin, Mohd Fadzli Saari who played in SV Wehen Wiesbaden in Germany and Muhammad Juzaili Samion who also played for the 4th division of Ligue 1 club, FCSR Haguenau in 2000.

In 2008, many players from talented young Shahzan Muda F.C. were absorbed into Sri Pahang.

In 2012, Sri Pahang was playing in the 2nd division of M-League. While in the Premier League, Sri Pahang showed great improvement in the 2012 season as they qualified for the Piala Malaysia quarter-finals. Sri Pahang was also Premier League runner-up in 2012, qualifying the association to play in the promotion "play-off" matches to the Liga Super. Sri Pahang beat Kedah FA in the final of the "play-off", winning promotion to the 2013 Liga Super.

In 2012, the association had to play in Temerloh Mini Stadium as the homeground for the first time after the Darul Makmur Stadium was put under renovation for the 2012 Sukma Games. A year later, the club returned to the newly-renovated Darul Makmur Stadium and in the same year, they lifted the Piala Malaysia for the third time, ending a 21-year cup drought.

Stadium

Sri Pahang are currently based at Darul Makmur Stadium in Kuantan, Pahang. The capacity of the stadium is 40,000 and also has a running track.

Players

First-team squad

Under-23s

Under-21s

Under-19s

Continental record

Honours

Domestic
League
 Division 1/ Liga Super
 Winners (5): 1987, 1992, 1995, 1999, 2004
 Runners-up (6): 1984, 1991, 1998, 2005, 2017, 2019
 Division 2/ Premier League
 Runner-up: 2012

Cup

 Piala Malaysia
 Winners (4): 1983, 1992, 2013, 2014
 Runners-up (4): 1984, 1994, 1995, 1997

 Piala FA
 Winners (3): 2006, 2014, 2018
 Runners-up (2): 1995, 2017

 Piala Sumbangsih
 Winners (3): 1992, 1993, 2014
 Runners-up (5): 1985, 1988, 1995, 2007, 2015

Continental
 ASEAN Club Championship
 Runner-up (1): 2005

Ownership and finances

Sponsorship

Head coaches

Team managers

Management team

Club personnel
Sri Pahang Football Club Sdn. Bhd. is the company which owns Sri Pahang Football Club.

Sri Pahang Football Club Sdn. Bhd.
Owners
YAM Tengku Abdul Rahman Ibni Sultan Ahmad Shah Al-Mustafi Billah
Raja Dato' Shaharudin bin Raja Jalil Shah
Rizal bin Che Hashim

President
YAM Tengku Abdul Rahman Ibni Sultan Ahmad Shah Al-Mustafi Billah

Deputy president
Muhammad Safian Ismail

Board of Directors
Raja Dato' Shaharudin bin Raja Jalil Shah
Rizal bin Che Hashim

Chief Executive Officer
Suffian Awang

Club record

Updated on 24 October 2019.

Note:

Pld = Played, W = Won, D = Drawn, L = Lost, F = Goals for, A = Goals against, D = Goal difference, Pts= Points, Pos = Position

Source:

AFC Club ranking

See also

 List of Malaysia Football Chairman

References

External links
 

 
Malaysia Super League clubs
Football clubs in Malaysia
Malaysia Cup winners
1959 establishments in Malaya
Association football clubs established in 1959